39th New York Film Critics Circle Awards
January 27, 1974
(announced January 3, 1974)

Best Picture: 
 Day for Night 
The 39th New York Film Critics Circle Awards, 27 January 1974, honored the best filmmaking of 1973.

Winners
Best Actor:
Marlon Brando - Last Tango in Paris (Ultimo tango a Parigi)
Runner-up: Al Pacino - Serpico
Best Actress: 
Joanne Woodward - Summer Wishes, Winter Dreams
Runner-up: Glenda Jackson - A Touch of Class
Best Director: 
François Truffaut - Day for Night (La nuit américaine)
Runner-up: Costa-Gavras - State of Siege (État de siège)
Best Film: 
Day for Night (La nuit américaine)
Runners-up: American Graffiti and Last Tango in Paris (Ultimo tango a Parigi)
Best Screenplay: 
George Lucas, Gloria Katz and Willard Huyck - American Graffiti
Best Supporting Actor: 
Robert De Niro - Mean Streets
Runner-up: John Houseman - The Paper Chase
Best Supporting Actress: 
Valentina Cortese - Day for Night (La nuit américaine)

References

External links
1973 Awards

1973
New York Film Critics Circle Awards, 1973
New York Film Critics Circle Awards
New York Film Critics Circle Awards
New York Film Critics Circle Awards
New York Film Critics Circle Awards